John O'Molony may refer to:

 John O'Molony (1591–1651), Irish Roman Catholic bishop and Irish Confederate  
 John O'Molony (1617–1702), Irish Roman Catholic bishop and Jacobite